Paschal is used as a name.  Paschal, a variant of Pascal, from Latin Paschalis, is an adjective describing either the Easter or Passover holidays.

People known as Paschal include:

Popes and religious figures

 Antipope Paschal (687), a rival with Theodore for Pope
 Pope Paschal I (died 824), head of the Catholic Church from 817
 Pope Paschal II (11th-century–1118), head of the Catholic Church from 1099
 Antipope Paschal III (1164–1168), Antipope from 1164
 Paschal Baylon (1540–1592), Spanish friar and saint

People with the surname

 Benjamin Edwin Paschal (1895–1974), American baseball outfielder
 Bill Paschal (1921–2003), American football running back
 Bobby Paschal (born 1941), American college basketball coach
 Janet Paschal (born 1956), Contemporary Christian and southern gospel
 James Roy Paschal (1926–2004), NASCAR Grand National and Winston Cup driver
 John Paschal (13th-century–1361), English Bishop
 Thomas M. Paschal (1845–1919), U.S. Representative from Texas

People with the given name

 Paschal Mooney, Irish politician

See also 
 Paschal Lamb (disambiguation)

Christian terminology